Australian National Boxing Federation (ANBF) is the governing body for the sport of professional boxing in Australia.

History
The body was founded in 1965 as the Australian Boxing Federation. In 1980s, the body took its current name of Australian National Boxing Federation. In 1977, the Australian Boxing Federation joined the Oriental and Pacific Boxing Federation and Pan Asian Boxing Association.

Structure
The national body has four state member associations – Queensland, New South Wales, Victoria and South Australia.

See also

List of Australian heavyweight boxing champions
List of Australian cruiserweight boxing champions
List of Australian middleweight boxing champions
List of Australian female boxing champions
Boxing Australia
Boxing in Australia
Commonwealth Boxing Council

References

External links

Boxing in Australia
Sports governing bodies in Australia
1965 establishments in Australia
Sports organizations established in 1965
Professional boxing organizations
Boxing articles needing attention